Otosaka (written: 乙坂) is a Japanese surname. Notable people with the surname include:

, Japanese baseball player

Fictional characters
, protagonist of the anime series Charlotte

Japanese-language surnames